Locke & Key is an American comic book series written by Joe Hill, illustrated by Gabriel Rodríguez, and published by IDW Publishing.

Plot summary
This plot is presented in chronological order. During the American Revolution, a group of Rebels, hiding beneath the future Keyhouse, discover a portal to another dimension, the plains of Leng, filled with demons who can mesmerize anyone that sees them and possess them through touch. However, when the demons attempt to enter the real world, they are transformed into "whispering" iron which young smith Benjamin Locke forges into a variety of magical keys, including the Omega Key, which seals the entrance to the dimension. The magic of the Keyhouse gradually evolves over the years, including a spell which causes occupants to forget about the keys and the magic of the house when they pass their 18th birthday. In 1988, a group of teenagers, having used the keys extensively in their high school years to their great delight, decide to open the black door with the Omega Key, hoping to trick a demon into entering the real world in order to provide more metal with which to make more keys. Rendell Locke's younger brother follows the group and is mesmerized by the door and when attempting to walk through it, he is stopped by Dodge who accidentally puts his hand through the door, becoming possessed by a demonic being. After plotting and attempting to kill his friends and enslave the others at the behest of the Child of Leng possessing him, Dodge is killed by Rendell.

Many years later, Dodge's spirit re-enters the physical world through the well at Keyhouse, due to actions taken by Dodge prior to his death. Trapped in the well, Dodge's spirit reaches out to a young abused prodigy, Sam Lesser, and convinces him to attack the Lockes and kill Rendell, looking for the Omega Key, as well as the Anywhere Key, which is capable of freeing Dodge from the well. After the gruesome murder of their father, the Locke kids, Tyler, Kinsey, and Bode move with their mother Nina across the country to Keyhouse and begin discovering its secrets. Sam escapes prison and follows the Lockes to Massachusetts. He attacks the family again at Keyhouse, at which time Dodge tricks Bode into bringing him the Anywhere Key. Dodge escapes from the well, kills Sam and returns to Lovecraft in the same body as he had thirty years before.

Dodge re-enters high school under the guise of a new student, intimidating his way into the home of one of Kinsey's teachers and Dodge's former friends. Over the next year, Dodge secretly tries to recover the various keys – in particular the Omega Key – from the children, collecting many, though hindered by Tyler and Kinsey. Dodge is eventually discovered but manages to switch bodies and possess Bode before they can kill him. Now free to explore the house as Bode, Dodge finally finds the Omega Key and plans his takeover after-prom party in the caves. He releases several demons and many of the students are killed. Dodge is ultimately undone by Tyler and Dodge's spirit is forced back into the well, though Bode's empty body is cremated before Bode's soul has a chance to return to it. In the epilogue, Tyler returns to the well to finally free Dodge's spirit from the demon, having used a sliver of whispering iron inherited from his father to forge an "Alpha Key" capable of undoing possession. Tyler is able to speak with his father one last time, and he restores Bode's physical form.

Publication history
The narrative of Locke & Key has a three-act structure, with each act covering two story arcs. Act One's first story arc, Welcome to Lovecraft, was a six-issue limited series published by IDW Publishing. The first issue of Welcome to Lovecraft was released on February 20, 2008, and sold out in a single day, requiring a second printing to be done immediately. The second arc of Act One, Head Games, commenced with the release of the first issue on January 22, 2009. The actual Head Games story was printed in four issues, with a standalone prologue ("Intermission" or "The Joe Ridgeway Story") and a standalone conclusion ("Army of One").

The first storyline of Locke & Key Act Two, Crown of Shadows, began in late 2009. The second storyline, Keys to the Kingdom, began in August 2010.

The first storyline of Act Three was announced as Time & Tide, but was retitled Clockworks. The second, and concluding, storyline is entitled Alpha & Omega.

Originally, the plan was to release the first five story arcs in a monthly format with the sixth arc published as an original graphic novel. The plan changed and the concluding story arc appeared in monthly installments.

Keys

In the universe of Locke & Key, there are many keys created from whispering iron that have different magical properties. Some of them are extensively featured in the series, while others are featured very briefly. The known keys are:

 Alpha Key: Removes demons from possessed people's souls when inserted into their chests. It instantly turns a demon to whispering iron so, if the demon is still inside the host, the key's effect is fatal.
 Angel Key: Gives the user angel-like wings that grant the ability to fly.
 Animal Key: Used on the right door in Keyhouse, it allows the user to travel through the door and transform into an animal. It is unclear whether they have choice in the matter. It appears that the key assigns the animal, according to some spiritual affinity. Returning back through the door transforms a person back into a human. This works for human ghosts that have possessed animal bodies. Animals may also transform into humans if they enter through the opposite side of the door.
 Anywhere Key: Opens a door to anywhere the bearer can visualize in their mind.
 Chain Key: Controls the Great Lock, which guards the catacombs with entangling chains.
 Demon Key: When held against the spine of a person a lock will appear. Upon being inserted, the victim becomes possessed by a demon.
 Echo Key: Allows entry to the Keyhouse wellhouse and, with the Echo Key in hand, allows a person to return a spirit from the dead to the world of the living. Leaving through the wellhouse door, however, banishes the spirit back to wherever it came from.
 Gender Key: Unlocks a half-sized door between rooms which changes the sex of a person who enters it.
 Ghost Key: When used in the right door in Keyhouse, it separates the soul from the body of whoever travels through the door. The body falls dead while their ghost is free to roam the Keyhouse grounds. Ghost souls can inhabit any other bodies nearby, and clash with other ghosts.
 Giant Key: This physically large key, once inserted into a keyhole-shaped window in Keyhouse, transforms the bearer into a massive giant.
 Grindhouse Key: Transforms whatever door it opens into a giant mouth that consumes whatever enters it.
 Harlequin Key: Unlocks the Harlequin Wardrobe and allows objects not normally inside to be seen.
 Head Key: Inserted into the base of someone's head, it allows one to peer inside the mind of a person, where memories and mental concepts (including "sanity" itself) are represented as tiny beings. The memories can be removed and swapped between people. Books inserted into a head with the Head Key transfer their contents to the bearer of the key, though in such a situation the knowledge of the text is accurate but superficial.
 Hell Key: The bearer is automatically the Lord of Hell and has absolute control over Hell.
 Hercules Key: Embedded in a necklace, it grants the bearer considerable strength and bulk.
 Identity Key: Upon inserting into the base of one's chin, the bearer can change any aspect of their appearance, including clothes, body, or even gender. Also allows a bearer to forcibly change the appearance of others.
 Keyhouse Key: A large key which fits into a stone slab and regenerates the Keyhouse after it is destroyed.
 Matchstick Key: Creates fires when inserted into a door or touched to an object, including a body.
 Mending Key: Opens a magical cabinet in the Keyhouse into which a broken object can be placed (the cabinet can resize itself to the size of the object). Once the object is locked inside the cabinet, it is repaired. While it can heal severely wounded people, it apparently cannot resurrect the dead.
 Mirror Key: When inserted into a mirror, allows the user to open a doorway to a parallel-pocket universe, called the Prison of the Self. This key affects a mirror's reflection if it is held toward a mirror, as it makes the reflection eerily pleasant and beckons the person to enter. The user is then enticed to come into the mirror by their reflection and upon entering, they find themselves in a dark, empty abyss.
 Moon Key: Allows the user to reach and open the Moon like a door, which allows the user to pass on to the afterlife peacefully. Inhabitants who cross the door see the living world like a stage they can observe and the afterlife like the backstage of a theater.
 Music Box Key: Inserted into a magical music box, it will cause the box to play a song that compels whoever is listening to obey its lyrics. Whoever turns the key can supply the commands. Commands are carried out so long as the music is playing and the listener can hear it.
 Omega Key: Opens the lock on the demonic door. The first key created.
 Owl Key: Gives the user control of a mechanical owl.
 Philosophoscope Key: Gives access to a device that allows viewing of various people and places.
 Reali Key: Allows passage to alternate dimensions.
 Shadow Key: Allows its wearer to control shadow creatures, and even the shadows of other people. Shadows are capable of interacting with the material world (often violently) but can be rendered immaterial by bright light. Embedded in a crown, the key is a tremendous source of power for the wearer. 
 Skin Key: A key with a gazing mirror on its handle, it can change the ethnicity of whoever is using it.
 Small World Key: Unlocks a dollhouse replica of Keyhouse, allowing the user to see anything in Keyhouse in realtime. Any interaction with the unlocked dollhouse also occurs within the actual house, such as a house spider entering the dollhouse magically emerging as a giant spider within the real house.
 Splody Key: Causes explosions in any building it is used within.
 Squirrel/Undertree Key: Controls squirrels.
 Tempus Fugit Key: Can turn the bearer into an older version of themselves, possibly other ages.
 Timeshift Key: Operates a grandfather clock that allows a user to observe (but not interact with) past events. The clock is limited to a specific time period: the earliest date one can visit is January 13, 1775, and the latest is December 31, 1999.
 Teddy Bear Key: Animates and controls stuffed teddy bears.
 Thorn Key: Controls plants, including for offensive purposes. This Key was redesigned and renamed the Plant Key for the Netflix series.
 Unnamed Riffel Key (unofficial name): A key created by Hans Riffel, the last person to use whispering iron before Tyler. The key is to the front door of Keyhouse Manor and implements the Riffel Rule, where no one who enters the front door of the house as an adult can directly see the power of the keys. People who age into adulthood will also begin to lose their conscious memories of the keys and their magic.

Story arcs

Locke & Key

Welcome to Lovecraft

Head Games

Crown of Shadows

Keys to the Kingdom

Clockworks

Alpha & Omega
The final arc is titled Locke & Key: Alpha & Omega; it collects Omega #1–5 and Alpha #1–2.

World War Key
At the 2019 San Diego Comic-Con, Joe Hill confirmed that a new Locke & Key series called World War Key was in the works. This storyline as Hill puts it is "about the idea that the past is never gone... and I think a lot of ghost stories are about ways the past keep bleeding through to the present. We'll visit the Revolutionary War, Civil War, and World War II to show how those past events have had lingering effects on our heroes today." As of 2019, the series is expected to run thirty-seven issues across six books (not including The Golden Age). World War Key is designed to be both a prequel and a sequel to the original run of Locke & Key.

The Golden Age
A series of short stories set in the past. In his newsletter, Joe Hill referred to the book as "World War Key 0: The Golden Age".

Locke & Key: …In Pale Battalions Go… will be a three-issue story that leads into World War Key, set at the beginning of the 20th century and will feature characters from "Small World" and "Open the Moon". It will also lead into the Locke & Key/Sandman Universe crossover comic. On February 21, 2020, IDW announced via their Twitter that Locke & Key would be crossing over with DC Comics's Sandman Universe.  The story, Hell & Gone, will center around DC's Key to Hell from The Sandman: Season of Mists. Hell & Gone will wrap up The Golden Age arc.

According to Joe Hill, ...In Pale Battalions Go... was originally supposed to be just two issues, but he quickly realized that it wasn't enough to tell the full story so it was increased to three.

Joe Hill has stated that the chronological order of the Golden Age chapters is as follows:

 Small World
 Open the Moon
Face the Music
 ...In Pale Battalions Go...#1
 ...In Pale Battalions Go...#2
 ...In Pale Battalions Go...#3
 Hell & Gone #1
 Hell & Gone #2

Revolution
The first arc of World War Key. Joe Hill stated in an interview that Revolution "takes place during the Revolutionary War and it's about how the magical keys won the Revolutionary War."

Resurrection 
The second arc of World War Key according to Joe Hill. He described the plot: "leaps forward to the modern-day, [where] we visit some favorite characters from the Locke & Key series, and we see how they're doing. And we all see the events of the Revolutionary War staining through into the present."

Standalone issues
Many fans believed that "GRINDHOUSE" and "DOG DAYS" were a part of the Golden Age arc until Joe Hill stated via Twitter that they are at the moment their own standalone stories that are not a part of any arc.

Collected editions

Standard editions

On November 11, 2014, the first six volumes were collected as a slipcase set of paperbacks.

Master editions
Locke & Key was also collected in three hardcover books with all-new cover art and design by Gabriel Rodriguez.
 Locke & Key Master Edition Volume 1 (May 19, 2015). Collects the first two arcs, Welcome to Lovecraft and Head Games.
 Locke & Key Master Edition Volume 2 (March 22, 2016). Collects the third and fourth arcs, Crown of Shadows and Keys to the Kingdom.
 Locke & Key Master Edition Volume 3 (October 18, 2016). Collects the fifth and sixth arcs, Clockworks and Alpha & Omega.

Keyhouse Compendium Edition 
All six arcs (Welcome to Lovecraft, Head Games, Crown of Shadows, Keys to the Kingdom, Clockworks, and Alpha & Omega) of the main story are to be published in one compendium edition, featuring new front and back cover art by Gabriel Rodriguez. The compendium had an original release date of October 2020, but it was delayed and eventually published July 20, 2021.

Signed limited editions
On November 11, 2007, Subterranean Press announced a pre-order for a hand-numbered, signed, limited edition of the six-issue run of Welcome To Lovecraft. This edition consisted of 250 numbered copies and 26 lettered copies, both of which sold out within 24 hours of being announced. This edition was a hardcover release in a specially designed and illustrated slipcase, and featured exclusive dust jacket art by Vincent Chong and reprinted all 250 pages of Joe Hill's script in addition to the actual comic work.

This was followed by the publication of Head Games, which was also limited to 250 hand-numbered and signed copies as well as 26 lettered copies.
The third volume, Crown of Shadows, is available for preorder, and like the previous editions is signed and numbered with the same limitations and also comes with an illustrated slipcase.
Cloth-bound trade editions limited to 1000 copies (unsigned, unnumbered, and without the slipcase) were also released. Trade editions for the first two volumes are sold out.

Awards and nominations
Comic Book/Graphic Novel

Netflix Adaptation

Awards and Nominations received by the Netflix series

Adaptations

Film
A film trilogy was officially announced at the 2014 Comic Con. Alex Kurtzman, Roberto Orci, Bobby Cohen and Ted Adams would produce the film with Universal Pictures and Kurtzman and Orci's production company K/O Paper Products.

In October 2015, Joe Hill confirmed that the films are no longer happening, though a TV series was still possible. In May 2016, Joe Hill announced he would write a TV pilot, serve as executive producer and pitch the show to various networks and streaming companies.

Television

Fox pilot (2010–2011)

Dimension Films acquired the film and television rights for Welcome to Lovecraft from IDW Publishing with the intent of developing the property as a feature with John Davis producing. In February 2010, it was announced that Dimension had lost the adaptation rights to Dreamworks with Alex Kurtzman and Roberto Orci signed on to develop and produce the project. In August 2010 Steven Spielberg also joined as a producer, and the production became a TV series rather than a movie adaptation, with Josh Friedman writing episodes for the show and acting as show-runner.

The TV series adaptation then landed at 20th Century Fox Television. The network greenlit a pilot, produced by Dreamworks TV and K/O Paper Products through the latter's deal with 20th Century Fox TV.

Miranda Otto played Nina Locke, Sarah Bolger was Kinsey Locke and Nick Stahl co-starred as Duncan Locke. Skylar Gaertner played 6-year old Bode, and Harrison Thomas played a teenager possessed by an evil spirit. Actor and singer Jesse McCartney appeared as Ty Locke, the series' male lead and Ksenia Solo was cast as Dodge.

Mark Romanek directed the pilot episode, which was filmed at the mansion in Hartwood Acres and in Ellwood City, Pennsylvania, in February 2011. The pilot was also shot throughout Pittsburgh that same month. In May 2011, Fox announced that the project would not be picked up to the series. The studio attempted to sell the project to other networks but eventually ceased efforts due to rising costs. The pilot was screened at the 2011 San Diego Comic-Con International, where it was well received.

Hulu pilot (2017–2018)

On April 20, 2017, Hulu ordered a pilot based on the comic with Carlton Cuse, Scott Derrickson, and Lindsey Springer as producers. In July 2017, Derrickson was replaced by Andy Muschietti as the pilot's director. In August 2017, Frances O'Connor was cast as Nina in the show. In a March 2018 interview, Samantha Mathis revealed that Hulu had passed on the show, and it was now being shopped around to other networks.

Netflix series (2020–2022)

On May 30, 2018, after Hulu had passed on Locke & Key, it was announced that Netflix was nearing a series order for a re-developed version of the show with Cuse and Hill involved once again, and Muschietti as executive producer. The show found a new director for the pilot and an entirely new cast with the exception of Jackson Robert Scott as Bode Locke, who was cast in the Hulu pilot as well.

Season one of the show, with 10 episodes, debuted on Netflix on February 7, 2020.
Season two of the show, with 10 episodes, debuted on Netflix on October 22, 2021.
The third and final season of the show, with 8 episodes, debuted on Netflix on August 10, 2022.

Audio drama
All six books of Locke & Key were adapted as a 13-hour audio drama released on 5 October 2015. Produced by the AudioComics Company for Audible Studios and directed by William Dufris, the work features voice actors including Tatiana Maslany, Haley Joel Osment, Kate Mulgrew, and Brennan Lee Mulligan, with appearances by series creators Rodríguez and Hill, as well as Hill's father Stephen King, in addition to almost 50 voice-over actors and an original score by Peter Van Riet. The work received critical praise, and in 2016 was nominated for four Audie Awards from the Audiobook Publisher's Association of America, including "Best Original Work" and "Excellence in Production."

Card game
In 2012, Cryptozoic Entertainment released a card game based on the series.

See also
The Lost Room – Prior work from 2006 with a very similar main concept to Locke & Key, a set of magical objects with different properties including a key that opens any door to anywhere.

References

Sources

External links
 Locke & Key section at Joe Hill's website
 Gabriel Rodriguez's online gallery at DeviantArt
 Locke & Key section at IDW Publishing's website
 Interview with Joe Hill about the series at Newsarama
 Writer Joe Hill Talks to TFAW.com About Locke & Key From IDW
 Chilean version (Spanish language book) at Librería Dinova

2009 comics debuts
2010 comics debuts
Cthulhu Mythos comics
Comics set in Massachusetts
Fiction about shapeshifting
Dark fantasy
Works by Joe Hill (writer)